Piquiri River or Piquirí River may refer to
 Piquiri River (Paraná), a tributary of the Paraná River in Brazil
 Piquirí River (São Lourenço), a tributary of the São Lourenço River in Brazil